Biotocus turbinatus was a species of land snail, a gastropod in the family Odontostomidae.

This species was endemic to Brazil; it is now considered extinct.

References

External links 

Odontostomidae
Extinct gastropods
Endemic fauna of Brazil
Extinct animals of Brazil
Gastropods described in 1845
Taxonomy articles created by Polbot
Taxobox binomials not recognized by IUCN